Sir David Arthur Rhodes Williams  (born 17 April 1941) is a New Zealand lawyer, jurist, and international arbitrator. From 2005 to 2010 he served as Chief Justice of the Cook Islands.

Williams was born in 1941 in Auckland. In the 2017 New Year Honours, he was appointed a Knight Companion of the New Zealand Order of Merit, for services to international law and international arbitration.

References

1941 births
Living people
New Zealand King's Counsel
High Court of New Zealand judges
New Zealand judges on the courts of the Cook Islands
Arbitrators
Environmental lawyers
Knights Companion of the New Zealand Order of Merit
People from Auckland
Chief justices of the Cook Islands